Emil Sick (June 3, 1894 – November 10, 1964) was a brewing worker and industrialist in Canada and later the U.S. He is best known for his involvement as owner of baseball teams and stadiums in Seattle and Vancouver, British Columbia from the 1930s until 1960.

In 1928 he founded, with Frederick McCall, an aviation company, the Great Western Airways that acquired Purple Label Airlines operating Stinson Detroiter.

See also
Sick's Stadium
List of defunct airlines of Canada
Seattle Postcards: The Seattle Rainiers. credit: The Seattle Times. [Link]

References

External links
 NWSABR – photo
 

1894 births
1964 deaths
Canadian brewers
Businesspeople from Seattle
American brewers
20th-century Canadian businesspeople
20th-century American businesspeople